Port Everglades is a seaport in Fort Lauderdale, Florida, located in Broward County. Port Everglades is one of South Florida's foremost economic engines, as it is the gateway for both international trade and cruise vacations. In 2019, Port Everglades was ranked the third-busiest cruise homeport in the world, accommodating more than 3.89 million passengers. It was also one of the busiest container ports in Florida and ranked among the top 20 busiest in the United States, moving more than 1 million TEUs annually.

The port is also South Florida's main seaport for petroleum products including gasoline, jet fuel, and alternative fuels. The port serves as the primary storage and distribution seaport for refined petroleum products. Port Everglades distributes fuel to 12 Florida counties and supplies jet fuel to four international airports. Port Everglades is also recognized as a favorite United States Navy liberty port.

The Port Everglades Department is a self-supporting enterprise fund of the Broward County government, with operating revenues of approximately $170.7 million in fiscal year 2019. The port does not rely on local property taxes for operations. The total value of economic activity at Port Everglades is approximately $32 billion annually. Approximately 219,000 statewide jobs are impacted by the port, including more than 13,000 people who work for companies that provide direct services to Port Everglades.

Port Everglades is the #1 seaport in Florida by revenue as well as one of the top container ports in the state. Port Everglades is consistently ranked among the top three multi-day cruise homeports in the world with 902 ship calls and 3.89 million passengers in fiscal year 2019, and the #2 petroleum port in Florida with 526 ship calls and 125.8 million barrels.

History
Port Everglades is composed of land within three municipalities, Hollywood, Fort Lauderdale and Dania Beach and unincorporated Broward County. Port Everglades is a man-made seaport. The port was originally dredged from Lake Mabel, a natural body of water that was a wide and shallow section of the Florida East Coast Canal system. In 1911, the Florida Board of Trade passed a resolution that called for a deep-water port. The port was originally intended to ship produce to the North and the West. In 1913, the Fort Lauderdale Harbor Company was formed and eventually dug out the Lake Mabel Cut, which opened the New River to the sea and created access for small boats.

In 1924, the founder and mayor of the city of Hollywood, Florida, Joseph Wesley Young, bought  of land adjacent to the lake. He then created the Hollywood Harbor Development Company. Three years later, the Florida Legislature established the Broward County Port Authority. On February 22, 1928, 85 percent of Broward County's residents gathered for a ceremony in which President Calvin Coolidge was to push a button from the White House detonating explosives to remove the rock barrier separating the harbor from the Atlantic Ocean. The button malfunctioned, but the barrier was removed shortly thereafter.

Bay Mabel Harbor was dedicated on February 22, 1928. Many of South Florida's local women's clubs agreed that the port needed a new name to better represent the region. They held a name changing contest, and the name Port Everglades was selected.
The container handling capacity of the port was increased with a new  terminal, completed in 2010. The expansion increased Port Everglades' freight handling area by 15%.

In 2015, the US Army Corps of Engineers approved a new phase of expansion for Port Everglades with the deepening and widening of the port's channels. The project received federal authorization in December 2016 under the Water Infrastructure Improvements for the Nation (WIIN) Act. The port served ships from Europe and South America that were too large to fit through the Panama Canal, but the ships still had to be under a certain load to fit properly in the port. The project was planned to be completed in 2028, create approximately 4,789 construction jobs and 1,491 direct jobs locally, and cost $509.6 million.
In February 2020, the port received $29.1 million from Congress for the Intracoastal Waterway portion of the expansion; a section of the Waterway would be widened by 250 feet and be completed by 2023. The remaining funds, estimated up to $437 million, is expected to arrive at the end of 2021 and fund the deepening portion of the project, now scheduled to be completed between 2024 and 2026.

In May 2017, Port Everglades received approval to begin the Southport Turning Notch Extension (STNE) project, its largest capital improvement project in the Port's history. The existing deepwater turn-around area would be lengthened by 1,500 feet, from 900 feet to 2,400 feet. The lengthening makes it possible for up to five new cargo ship berths to be added. Additionally, existing gantry crane rails will be extended, and three new super-post-Panamax container gantry cranes where manufactured to supplement the expansion. The STNE also replaced 8.7 acres of an existing mangrove conservation easement with a 16.5-acre mangrove upland easement. In June 2017, Port Everglades received approval to purchase the three new gantry cranes and in June 2018, Port Everglades Chief Executive Steven Cernak gave the approval to begin manufacturing three "Super Post-Panamax" gantry cranes to increase the port's cargo volume. Each crane, manufactured by ZPMC, cost $13.8 million, and measures 175 feet tall. They are expected to arrive in 2020.

Impact and recognition

Influence on Broward County 
Port Everglades has a large economic impact on Broward County. In FY2019, the Port generated over $32 billion in economic activity and more than 219,000 statewide jobs. As the third-busiest cruise homeport in the world, it directly affects the region's tourism industry, with more than 3.89 million cruise passengers arriving in 2019 According to a 2015 study, 62% of surveyed passengers stayed in South Florida for at least a night prior to their cruise and 21% arrived at their cruise directly from Fort Lauderdale-Hollywood International Airport. 21% of surveyed passengers stayed in South Florida after their cruise.

In 2019, Port Everglades generated over $32 billion in business activity. The port also generated over 219,000 jobs throughout the state of Florida. This resulted in a total of $809,333 taxes collected on the state and local level. In 2017, Port Everglades was also ranked America's second-largest port for exports to Cuba, behind Port of Brunswick in Georgia.

Condominium residents who live in buildings next to the channel of Port Everglades often bid bon voyage to cruise ships as they embark on their voyages from Port Everglades with the "Condo Salute." The residents blow horns, ring bells, or wave scarves, and the ships often respond by blowing their horns back.

Notable ships 
Ships sail from Port Everglades year round, but the peak season for cruise travel from Port Everglades is from November to April, with most itineraries sailing to the Caribbean. Port Everglades was once home to  when she was laid up as a museum ship from 1968 until 1970. Besides RMS Queen Elizabeth, Port Everglades has been used to dock many notable and famous ships. In 2004,  completed her maiden voyage and her maiden transatlantic voyage at Port Everglades.

In the 21st century, Port Everglades has been the homeports for four of the largest passenger ships in the world, the  ships, thus far. In late 2010, she was joined at Port Everglades by her sister ship, .

In November 2018,  performed her maiden call at Port Everglades. In anticipation of her arrival, Port Everglades invested $120 million into the port's first-ever brand-designed cruise terminal, the largest investment that Port Everglades has made towards any cruise terminal at the port. With this development, it is expected that Celebrity Cruises will bring about 500,000 travelers to Port Everglades.

Records and achievements

Seatrade Insider named Port Everglades "World's Top Cruise Port" for 2010. Between 2009 and 2016, Port Everglades was named Best U.S. Homeport by Porthole Cruise Magazine several times.

Port Everglades' growth has also been marked in a series of world record for most cruise passengers in a single day. On December 21, 2003, the port hosted a world record of 15 cruise ships, processing 44,108 passengers. On March 20, 2010, there were 53,365 passengers. On December 20, 2015, there were 53,485 passengers. On March 13, 2016, there were 55,885 passengers. On December 1, 2019, there were 55,964 passengers.

Timeline

In 1911, the Florida Board of Trade passed a resolution calling for a deep-water port to ship farmers' produce to the North and West.
In 1913, the Fort Lauderdale Harbor Company was formed and eventually dug out the Lake Mabel Cut, opening the New River to the sea for small boats.
In 1924, Joseph Wesley Young, founder and mayor of the city of Hollywood, bought 1,440 acres of land adjacent to the lake and created Hollywood Harbor Development Company.
In 1926, Young helped get a $2 million harbor improvement bond measure overwhelmingly passed by voters in Hollywood and Fort Lauderdale.
In 1927, the Florida State Legislature establishes the Broward County Port Authority.
On February 22, 1928, 85 percent of Broward County's residents gathered for a ceremony in which President Calvin Coolidge was to push a button from the White House detonating explosives to remove the rock barrier separating the harbor from the ocean. Nothing happened, but the barrier was removed shortly thereafter.
In 1928, Port Everglades was named through a contest conducted by several area women's groups.
In 1929, Fort Lauderdale dedicated its first airport. That same year, the Port project was completed and the Port obtained certificates for construction of a railway connecting the Port to the Florida East Coast Railway.
In 1929, the SS Vogtland became the first cargo ship and first foreign-flagged vessel to enter Port Everglades.
In 1931, Port Everglades welcomed United Fruit Co., as the port's first official cruise line.
In 1931, Aeroland Oil Co. is the first petroleum company to enter into an agreement for land and pipeline easements. Belcher (Coastal Fuels), Standard Oil (Chevron) and American Oil (Amoco) follow suit.
1941-1943, Port Everglades is used as a military base for the U.S. Navy.
The 1940s saw a burgeoning military presence and the 1950s brought cruise liners from around the world to the Port. Around that time, the Fort Lauderdale Rotary Club began greeting ships with Florida orange juice. The tradition continued for 20 years.
1960s: The Broward County Port Authority was renamed the Port Everglades Authority and the site of the future Southport cargo terminal was purchased.
1970s: The Port became the center of Florida's first Foreign trade zone.
1980s: The Port purchased its first rail-mounted container gantry crane.
1990s: The Greater Fort Lauderdale/Broward County Convention Center opened at Northport, two parking garages were completed and on November 22, 1994, Port Everglades' governance was transferred from the Port Authority to the Broward County government.
In 1994, Port Everglades becomes an enterprise fund governed by Broward County.
2000s: Port Everglades continuously breaks its own world record for handling the most cruise passengers.
In 2001, Port Everglades dedicated a new Operations Center and Harbormaster Tower constructed atop the Midport Parking Garage. Port Everglades also celebrated its 70th cruise season hosting the world's largest collection of five star ships.
In 2003, on February 28, port users and customers celebrated the 75th Anniversary of Port Everglades.
In 2004, Port Everglades greeted the Queen. Cunard Line's , the world's largest ocean liner, as she made her first visit to mainland U.S. from the UK, by arriving at Port Everglades, her U.S. winter home port. QM2 is the longest, widest, tallest and most expensive ocean liner ever built.
In 2009, Port Everglades opened the World's Largest Cruise Terminal and home of Royal Caribbean's 5,400-passenger , the largest cruise ship in the world at the time.
In 2012, Port Everglades was the first port in Florida to join the Green Marine program, which helps ports meet various standards to improve environmental impact and reduce the footprint of the port.
In 2015, Port Everglades was approved for expansion by the US Army Corps of Engineers.
In March 2016, Port Everglades broke the Guinness World Record for number of cruisers in a day at 55,885.

See also
 United States container ports

References

External links

 
 History of Port Everglades
 Port Everglades Webcam
 Ocean Liners and Cruise Ships of Port Everglades in the early 1960s

Everglades, Port
Economy of Fort Lauderdale, Florida
Transportation in Fort Lauderdale, Florida
Geography of Broward County, Florida
Tourist attractions in Broward County, Florida
1928 establishments in Florida
Transportation buildings and structures in Broward County, Florida